Sadiya College, established in 1982, is a major and general degree college situated in Sadiya, Tinsukia district, Assam. This college is affiliated with the Dibrugarh University.

Departments

Arts
 Assamese
 English
History
Education
Economics
Philosophy
Political Science
Sociology

Science
Zoology
Botany
Mathematics
Physics
Chemistry

Commerce

References

External links

Universities and colleges in Assam
Colleges affiliated to Dibrugarh University
Educational institutions established in 1982
1982 establishments in Assam